The Women's discus throw competition at the 1976 Summer Olympics in Montreal was held on 28–29 July.

Results

Qualification
The qualification distance was set to 55.00 metres.

Final

References

External links
 Official report

Athletics at the 1976 Summer Olympics
Discus throw at the Olympics
1976 in women's athletics
Women's events at the 1976 Summer Olympics